FC APK Morozovsk was a Russian football team from Morozovsk. It played professionally from 1988 to 1996. It played on the second highest level, Russian First Division, in 1992 and 1993. It was called Luch Azov (1988–1989) and APK Azov (1990–1993).

As FC Luch Azov, they were Rostov Oblast champions six times (1969, 1981, 1983–86).

Some team alumni had international caps – Aleksei Gerasimenko and Yuri Kovtun.

External links
  History by KLISF

Association football clubs disestablished in 1998
Defunct football clubs in Russia
Sport in Rostov Oblast
1998 disestablishments in Russia